Kiratpur (Kolada) is a Village Post- Danpur in Rudrapur Mandal, Udham Singh Nagar district of Uttarakhand State, India.

Location
Kiratpur Kolada is 4 km from its district's main city Rudrapur, and 280 km from its state's main city Dehradun. The nearest villages in Kiratpur are Danpur, Bagwala, Bhagwanpur, Bindukhera, Amarpur, Jafarpur, Phulsunga, Gangapur, Indrapur, Lalpur, Anandpur and Bandiya. Nearby towns are Gadarpur (9.1 km), Sitarganj (31.1 km), Kashipur (48.4 km), Khatima (55.9 km),

Situated 220 km from National Capital Delhi, this town lies on National Highway 74 between Rudrapur and Udham Singh Nagar.

Demographics
The population is predominantly composed of traders and small scale industrialists. Majority of population follows Hinduism. Both the communities have lived in harmony for a long time. Cricket has been very popular in the town and nearby villages.

Civic amenities
The town is Rudrapur has a police station, two post offices and a government operated hospital. Many nationalised banks have started their branches in the town.

References

Cities and towns in Udham Singh Nagar district

bpy:কিরাতপুর
it:Kiratpur
new:किरातपुर
pl:Kiratpur
pt:Kiratpur
pt:Kolada
vi:Kiratpur
zh:基拉特普尔